Edward Charles Egerton Weeks (born 25 October 1980) is an English actor, comedian, writer and producer. He is best known for starring as Dr. Jeremy Reed in the Fox/Hulu comedy series The Mindy Project (2012–2017). He also starred as Colin in the Fox comedy series LA to Vegas (2018).

Early life and career
Weeks was born and raised in England. His mother is a native of El Salvador. Weeks was educated at Queen's College, Taunton and Trinity College, Cambridge, where he was President of the Cambridge Footlights. Upon graduating, he wrote for various TV shows, including Man Stroke Woman, Clone and Hotel Trubble (all BBC).

As an actor, he appeared in My Family (BBC), The IT Crowd (Channel 4), Not Going Out (BBC) and Phoo Action (BBC) in which he played Prince William. He was Olivia Lee's sidekick and co-prankster on her Comedy Central hidden camera show Dirty Sexy Funny.

U.S.
In 2011, Weeks moved to Los Angeles, and sold an original pilot to CBS. In 2012, he was one of the first regular roles cast in The Mindy Project.

The show was picked up by Fox in May 2012 and, after moving to Hulu, was renewed in 2017 for a 6th and final season.

In 2015, Weeks guest-starred as a pretentious method actor on the USA Network series Royal Pains. The same year, he appeared in the film The Leisure Class.

In November 2015, ABC bought the rights to a comedy series that Weeks co-wrote with Hannah Mackay (former writer on Peep Show) and ordered a pilot. The show was to be produced by Weeks, Mackay and Mindy Kaling.

In March 2017, Weeks joined the Fox comedy pilot LA to Vegas, playing a recovering alcoholic/gambler/sex addict who is separated from his wife. In May the same year, the pilot was picked up for series.

Filmography

Film

Television

References

External links
 
 

1980 births
Living people
British actors of Latin American descent
British male television writers
English comedy writers
English male comedians
English male film actors
English male television actors
English people of Salvadoran descent
English television writers
People educated at Queen's College, Taunton
People from Banbury
20th-century English male actors
21st-century English male actors